Margo Van Puyvelde (born 21 December 1995) is a Belgian hurdler and sprinter who competes in international elite events. Her highest achievement is achieving fifth place at the 2019 European Athletics Indoor Championships in Glasgow in the 4 x 400 metre relay and is a national record holder in this event.

References

1995 births
Living people
Belgian female hurdlers
Belgian female sprinters
Competitors at the 2017 Summer Universiade